Hypostomus obtusirostris is a species of catfish in the family Loricariidae. It is native to South America, where it occurs in the coastal drainage basins of southeastern Brazil. The species reaches at least  in total length and is believed to be a facultative air-breather.

References 

obtusirostris
Fish described in 1907
Catfish of South America
Taxa named by Franz Steindachner